Nathalia Alfaro Paniagua (born April 8, 1987 in Heredia) is a beach volleyball player from Costa Rica, who played in the Swatch FIVB World Tour 2005 at the Acapulco step, playing with Ingrid Morales.

Representing her native country during the 2006 Central American and Caribbean Games playing with Yanina Aguilar and the 2007 Pan American Games with Ingrid Morales, she finished eighth and ninth.

Playing in Puerto Vallarta with Ingrid Morales, they won the ''2008 Torneo Internacional de Voleibol de Playa de Puerto Vallarta.

She won the silver medal at the NORCECA Beach Volleyball Circuit 2008 and 2009 at Santo Domingo, Dominican Republic.

At her home country, she has won five consecutive beach volleyball championships, from 2005 to 2009.

She played Indoor Volleyball with her National Team at the 2007 NORCECA Championship.

References

External links
 
 
 
 

1987 births
Living people
Costa Rican women's volleyball players
Costa Rican beach volleyball players
Costa Rican women's beach volleyball players
Pan American Games competitors for Costa Rica
Beach volleyball players at the 2007 Pan American Games
People from Heredia (canton)
Beach volleyball players at the 2015 Pan American Games
Beach volleyball players at the 2011 Pan American Games
Beach volleyball players at the 2016 Summer Olympics
Olympic beach volleyball players of Costa Rica